The South Carolina Education Lottery (SCEL) began in 2002.

South Carolina is a member of the Multi-State Lottery Association (MUSL), best known for Powerball. Like most US lotteries, on January 31, 2010, it participated in the cross-sell lottery expansion, adding Mega Millions.

SCEL-only games consist of Pick 3, Pick 4, Palmetto Cash 5 and Cash Pop.

The minimum age to purchase SCEL tickets is 18.

Current draw games

In-house draw games

Pick-3
This game is drawn 13 times a week, every week except for the week of Christmas Day when it’s only drawn 12 times as there are no midday drawings on Sunday and Christmas Day. The pick 3 machine has 3 compartments each containing 10 balls numbered 0 through 9. The lottery draws one number from each compartment. Prices, prizes, and options vary.

Pick 4
Pick 4 also is drawn 13 times weekly except for the week of Christmas Day. The system for selecting the numbers is the same as the pick 3 game and made up from a 4 compartment  machine. Prices, prizes, and options vary.

Fireball

On May 3, 2021, the South Carolina Education Lottery added fireball to its pick 3 and pick 4 games. Adding fireball gives players an extra number to improve their chances of winning a prize. Activating the fireball feature doubles the price of each set of numbers that the player activated the fireball feature and can be added to any of the play styles that either game offers. During each pick 3 and pick 4 drawings, after the winning numbers are selected for the base game an additional ball is drawn for fireball from a pool of 10 balls numbered 0-9 and it applies to both pick 3 and pick 4. Players can use the fireball number to replace any one of the lottery drawn numbers to make a fireball prize winning combination & win a fireball prize. Fireball prizes are separate and can be won in addition to the base game prizes. The odds of winning fireball prizes depend on the numbers chosen and play type.

Palmetto Cash 5 (formally Carolina 5)
This game began on Jun. 8, 2002 as Carolina 5. The first drawing was on Jun. 14, 2002. This game was only drawn on Fridays up until June 10, 2003 when a Tuesday drawing was added. On June 13, 2004, a Monday drawing was added and the game was drawn every Monday Wednesday and Friday despite the Tuesday drawing being dropped. On Tue Feb. 1, 2005, Carolina 5 became an instant game as "instant carolina 5". Players had to pick 5 numbers from 1-36. As of Feb. 1, 2005 when Palmetto Cash 5 replaced Carolina 5, players pick 5 numbers from 1-38. Each game costs $1 to play ($2 with the power up feature). Originally PC5 was drawn on Mon, Wed, and Fri, until January 30, 2007, when a Tue and Thur drawing was added. On Jan. 31, 2009, a Sat drawing was added. As of Dec. 5, 2010, Palmetto Cash 5 are held every day. It draws 5 balls from 1 through 38. Palmetto Cash 5 also draws a Power-Up multiplier that is randomly drawn from 28 balls with 16 being marked with a "2", 12 with a" 3", 1 with a "5" and 1 with a "10". Games cost $1 each; the Power-Up option costs an additional $1 per game. The top prize is set at $100,000 (unlike Mega Million's Megaplier, and Powerball's PowerPlay, the Power-Up multiplier also applies to the top prize). This means that players can multiply their winnings up to $1 million cash with every game that has a $2 purchase ($1 base game play and a $1 power up add on). The top prize for the base game has a $1 million liability limit and the top prize for the power up feature has a $2.5 million liability limit for each drawing.

CASH POP

This game began on Mon Jan 17, 2022. Players can choose one or more numbers from 1-15 and choose either a $1, $2, $5 or a $10 wager on each number that they choose.  players can choose all the numbers to be guaranteed a winner for the drawing. The SCEL draws one number from balls numbered 1–15. If the player matches the winning number drawn, he/she wins a prize shown on the printed cash pop ticket. The player can also win a prize instantly, though the chances of winning instantly are better than on a drawing. Players can wager up to $900 each time they ask for a cash pop ticket. Cash Pop drawings take place immediately after the Pick 3 and Pick 4 midday drawings and after the Palmetto Cash 5 drawing.

Multi State Games

Powerball

The SCEL joined the game on October 9, 2002. Players pick 5 numbers from 1-69 for the white balls and one bonus number from 1-26 for the powerball. Players win a prize by matching 3 out of the 5 white balls drawn with or without the powerball or by matching the powerball number with 2, 1, or 0 white balls. Each set of numbers costs $2 for the Base game. Players can also add the power play and/or double play features, each for $1 more. The parimutuel jackpot starts at $40,000,000 annuity or an available cash option. The double play drawing takes place immediately after the main powerball drawing.

Mega Millions

The SCEL was among the powerball members to join the game during the 2010 cross sell expansion. Players pick 5 numbers from 1-70 for the White balls and one bonus number from 1-25 for the Mega Ball. players win prizes by matching at least 3 out of the 5 white ball numbers drawn with or without the mega ball or matching the mega ball with 2, 1 or 0 white balls drawn. Each set of numbers costs $2 for the base game. For an extra $1 on each set, the players can ADD megaplier to multiply any non jackpot prize up to 5 times. The parimutuel jackpot starts at $40,000,000 annuity or an available cash option.

Former Games

The South Carolina education lottery offered several games which would later be discontinued for a reason.

These games include:

Mega Match 6 

This game began on January 30, 2008, as a 6/37 game. Players got 3 sets of numbers for $2 to try to win a progressive jackpot that starts at $550,000. Drawings were held on Tuesday and Friday nights. On December 2, 2009, the SCEL announced that this game would end on the drawing on Tuesday, December 29, 2009, to avoid confusion with the multi state Mega Millions game that the lottery has joined in January of 2010.

Carolina Cash 6 

This game began on April 2, 2013, as a 6/38 game. Players would pick 6 numbers from 1–38 to try to win a top prize of $200,000 taxes paid. Players got 3 sets of numbers for $2.  Players had to match at least 3 of the 6 numbers drawn to win a prize. On August 12, 2013, the SCEL announced that the game would end after the October 17, 2013 drawing after sales for the game which was introduced in April of that same year fell short of expectations with player interest.

Lucky For Life

The game started in South Carolina on Tue, Jan 27, 2015 whenever the format changed to 5/48 + 1/18. Players would pick 5 numbers from a field of 48 and one lucky ball from a field of 18. Each set of numbers cost $2. The top prize ($1,000 a day for life) was won by matching all the numbers on one set. The second prize ($25,000 a year for life) was won by matching all 5 white balls w/o the lucky ball. Players had to match at least one white ball with the lucky ball or match just the lucky ball to win a prize. On Tue Apr 22, 2021, the SCEL announced that it would end its participation of this game on the drawing on Mon Jun 28, 2021 drawing to explore some exciting new game opportunities for players that will launch in the coming months and enhance funding for education.

External links
South Carolina Education Lottery website

State lotteries of the United States
2002 establishments in South Carolina